Marvin Eugene Menzies (born October 15, 1961) is an American college basketball coach who is currently the head men's coach at the University of Missouri–Kansas City. Menzies was hired on April 26, 2022 after former coach Billy Donlon resigned to become an assistant coach at Clemson.   

He was previously the associate head coach at Grand Canyon University. He was named to the position at Grand Canyon on April 18, 2019. Menzies joined the Grand Canyon staff after 12 consecutive seasons as a head coach including a three-year run at UNLV and nine seasons at New Mexico State. Menzies was not retained when Bryce Drew was named head coach of Grand Canyon in March 2020.

Menzies was announced as UNLV head coach on April 17, 2016 as the successor to Chris Beard, who the previous week had accepted the head coaching position at Texas Tech. Fired from UNLV in March 2019, Menzies was replaced by former South Dakota State head coach T. J. Otzelberger.

At New Mexico State, Menzies replaced previous coach Reggie Theus. Like Theus, Menzies came to NMSU after spending the previous two years as an assistant coach under Rick Pitino at Louisville. In fact, Menzies had been hired by Louisville to replace Theus when he left that institution to take the head coaching job at NMSU in 2005. The NMSU job was Menzies' first head coaching position at a four-year institution. Menzies was the 24th person to hold the head coaching position in the history of Aggie basketball. Prior to his stint at Louisville, Menzies had previously served as an assistant coach at USC, San Diego State and Sacramento State and had served as head coach at Santa Monica College. He came to NMSU with 14 years of collegiate coaching experience.

Menzies holds a bachelor's degree in economics from UCLA and a master's in education from California State University, Sacramento. He is a member of Phi Beta Sigma fraternity.

Head coaching record

References

External links
 New Mexico State profile

1961 births
Living people
African-American basketball coaches
American men's basketball coaches
Basketball coaches from California
California State University, Sacramento alumni
College men's basketball head coaches in the United States
Grand Canyon Antelopes men's basketball coaches
High school basketball coaches in the United States
Louisville Cardinals men's basketball coaches
New Mexico State Aggies men's basketball coaches
Sacramento State Hornets men's basketball coaches
Santa Monica Corsairs men's basketball coaches
Sportspeople from Los Angeles
University of California, Los Angeles alumni
UNLV Runnin' Rebels basketball coaches
21st-century African-American people
20th-century African-American sportspeople